The Mausoleo Schilizzi (Schilizzi Mausoleum), also known as the Mausoleum of Posillipo or Ara Votiva per i Caduti della Patria is a monumental mausoleum built in the 1880s in a Neo-Egyptian style. It is located at Posillipo, Naples, and overlooks the bay from atop a hillside.

History

The Mausoleum was commissioned by the wealthy banker Matteo Schilizzi as a mausoleum to be placed in the Cemetery of Poggioreale, and the designs were by Alfonso Guerra. The work was completed by Alfonso's son, Camillo. The Caryatids at the entrance are by Giovanni Battista Amendola.

References

Mausoleum Schilizzi
Cemeteries in Naples
Burial monuments and structures